The Potomac Palisades Site is an archaeological site in Washington, D.C., United States. It is one of many archaeological sites located in the present-day Potomac Palisades; a 1984 field survey revealed evidence that supported earlier ideas of the archaeological richness of the northern bank of the Potomac in this area.

Among the artifacts found during excavation at the site is a triangle-shaped projectile point.  The primary use of the site appears to have been during the Late Archaic period, during which time it was heavily used as a lithic workshop.  In recognition of its archaeological value, the Potomac Palisades Site was listed on the National Register of Historic Places in 1982.

References

Archaeological sites in Washington, D.C.
Archaeological sites on the National Register of Historic Places in Washington, D.C.
Archaic period in North America
Lithics
Potomac River